The office of Deputy leader of the Liberal Democrats (officially Deputy leader of the Liberal Democrat Parliamentary Party) is a position within the Liberal Democrats, a liberal political party in the United Kingdom. The position of Deputy Leader has never formally existed in the party constitution, however since the party's foundation, the Liberal Democrat parliamentary group in the House of Commons have usually elected a Deputy Leader. Although often referred to as the Deputy Leader of the Liberal Democrats, this post is actually only Deputy Leader of the Liberal Democrat parliamentary group in the House of Commons and not Deputy Leader of the Lib Dems as a whole.

Daisy Cooper was elected by her fellow MPs to the post of Deputy Leader following Ed Davey's election to the post of leader in September 2020.

List of Deputy Leaders of the Liberal Democrats

Notes:
 1 Campbell served as acting leader between the resignation of Charles Kennedy on 7 January 2006 and his own election as leader on 2 March 2006.
 2 Cable served as acting leader between the resignation of Menzies Campbell on 15 October 2007 and the election of Nick Clegg on 18 December 2007.
 3 After leader Jo Swinson lost her seat in the 2019 General Election, Ed Davey in his role as Deputy Leader and Mark Pack as Party President became acting co-leaders until a leadership election could be held in 2020.

See also
Deputy Leader of the Conservative Party (UK)
Deputy Leader of the Labour Party (UK)

References

 Federal Constitution of the Liberal Democrats

External links
Liberal Democrat History Group

Leaders of the Liberal Democrats